Dark Was the Night may refer to:

Dark Was the Night (album), a 2009 compilation album
Dark Was the Night (2014 film), an American thriller film
Dark Was the Night (2018 film), an American drama film
"Dark Was the Night" (Grey's Anatomy), a 2011 episode of Grey's Anatomy

See also
"Dark Was the Night, Cold Was the Ground", a 1927 song by Blind Willie Johnson